Li Yifan (born 26 December 1998) is a Chinese professional basketball player for Beijing Great Wall and the Chinese national team.

She represented China at the 2021 FIBA Women's Asia Cup, where the team won the silver medal.

References

1998 births
Living people
Chinese women's basketball players
Shooting guards